Dobroivanovka is a rural locality (a selo) and the administrative center of Dobroivanovskoye Rural Settlement, Grayvoronsky District, Belgorod Oblast, Russia. The population was 136 as of 2010. There are 8 streets.

Geography 
Dobroivanovka is located 8 km northeast of Grayvoron (the district's administrative centre) by road. Dobroye is the nearest rural locality.

References 

Rural localities in Grayvoronsky District